Sury-le-Comtal is a commune in the Loire department in central France.

Population

Personalities 
Antoine Blanc (1792-1860) archbishop of New Orleans (Louisiana)

See also
Communes of the Loire department

References

Communes of Loire (department)